The 2005 Critérium du Dauphiné Libéré was the 57th edition of the Critérium du Dauphiné Libéré cycle race and was held from 5 June to 12 June 2005. The race started in Aix-les-Bains and finished in Sallanches. The race was won by Spanish rider Íñigo Landaluze, who has given positive in a doping test but whose case is still under dispute.

Teams
Twenty-one teams entered the race:

Route

Stages

Prologue
5 June 2005 — Aix-les-Bains, individual time trial (ITT)

Stage 1
6 June 2005 — Aix-les-Bains to Givors,

Stage 2
7 June 2005 — Givors to Chauffailles,

Stage 3
8 June 2005 — Roanne to Roanne, individual time trial (ITT)

Stage 4
9 June 2005 — Tournon-sur-Rhône to Mont Ventoux,

Stage 5
10 June 2005 — Vaison-la-Romaine to Grenoble,

Stage 6
11 June 2005 — Albertville to Morzine-Avoriaz,

Stage 7
12 June 2005 — Morzine-Avoriaz to Sallanches,

Classification leadership table

References

Further reading

External links 

2005
Criterium du Dauphine
2005 in French sport
June 2005 sports events in France